Sindi is a city and a municipal council in Wardha district. Sindi is also known as Pola city. Sindi railway station is important stop between Wardha-Nagpur central rail route.

Geography
It has an average elevation of 243 metres (797 feet).

Transport
There is a railway Station on Wardha - Nagpur line of Central Railways.

Demographics
 India census, Sindi had a population of 13,052. Males constitute 52% of the population and females 48%. Sindi has an average literacy rate of 73%, higher than the national average of 59.5%: male literacy is 79%, and female literacy is 67%. In Sindi, 12% of the population is under 6 years of age.

References

Cities and towns in Wardha district